Leisure Arts is an American publisher and distributor of "how-to" and lifestyle publications, craft kits and craft essentials.

Established in 1971 in Libertyville, Illinois, Leisure Arts relocated to Little Rock, Arkansas in 1977. In 1992, the company was acquired by Time Warner and became a part of its Southern Progress division. Time Warner sold Leisure Arts to Liberty Media in 2007. The company was acquired by Comcast Corporation in 2014. Then acquired again in 2017, by Vista Partners, LLC, a small Oregon based corporation that has previously specialized in wholesale craft distribution.

An in-house team of designers and editors develops titles each year. They also create publications with other publishers, licensed partners, and manufacturers.

The company's products also include DVDs and webcasts produced with TriCoast Studios in California, designed for teaching and entertaining.

All production and pre-press preparation for publications are handled by an in-house graphics departments. Photography and webcast productions are created on-site.

References

External links

Companies based in Little Rock, Arkansas
American companies established in 1971
Publishing companies established in 1971
Book publishing companies of the United States
Former Comcast subsidiaries
Former Liberty Media subsidiaries
1971 establishments in Illinois
2014 mergers and acquisitions